Paul Smith's Electric Light and Power and Railroad Company Complex is a national historic district located at Saranac Lake in Franklin County, New York.  It contains two contributing buildings (a powerhouse and an office building) and two contributing structures (a dam and a bridge). The powerhouse was built in 1908-1909 and is a one-story, single room brick building on a stone foundation measuring 40 feet by 55 feet.  The office building was built in 1927 and is a three-story steel and masonry building with a terra cotta exterior.  It is three bays wide by four bays deep.  The Main Street Bridge is a concrete slab bridge built between 1924 and 1931.  The Lake Flower Dam and Power Flume was built between 1936 and 1938 with Works Progress Administration assistance.

It was listed on the National Register of Historic Places in 1987.

References

Historic districts on the National Register of Historic Places in New York (state)
Neoclassical architecture in New York (state)
Industrial buildings and structures on the National Register of Historic Places in New York (state)
Historic districts in Franklin County, New York
Dams completed in 1938
National Register of Historic Places in Franklin County, New York